Chicken & Egg Pictures is a US based film organization that supports women and gender-nonconforming nonfiction filmmakers whose artful and innovative storytelling catalyzes social change. Founded in 2005, by Julie Parker Benello, Judith Helfand and Wendy Ettinger. 

They have produced such films as The Oath (2010), The Invisible War (2012), The Square (2013), Whose Streets? (2017), The Feeling of Being Watched (2018), One Child Nation (2019), Coded Bias (2020), and Ascension (2021).

History
In 2005, Julie Parker Benello, Judith Helfand, and Wendy Ettinger launched Chicken and Egg Pictures a film production and television production company focused on producing documentary film and television projects focusing on social issues directed by women. The organization offers grants to women and gender non-conforming filmmakers worldwide, with the grants being offered to various phases of production, including filming, post-production, and distribution. The organization offers a lab to first or second time filmmakers called the (Egg)celerator Lab, offering $35k towards production on their documentary feature.

References

External links
 

Film production companies of the United States
Television production companies of the United States
Mass media companies established in 2005
Companies established in 2005
Entertainment companies based in New York City